was a scholar and statesman in Meiji period Japan. He often used the pen-name Kanda Kōhei.

Kanda was born in the Fuwa District of Mino Province, (present-day Gifu Prefecture). He studied rangaku and became a teacher at the Tokugawa bakufu's Bansho Shirabesho institute for researching western science and technology.

After the Meiji Restoration, Kanda was appointed governor of Hyōgo Prefecture, and also worked for the new Meiji government as an advisor on economics and governmental structures, and was responsible for developing and implementing the Land Tax Reforms of 1873–1881, and for establishing local administration structures. He was appointed to the House of Peers in 1890.

His translation of William Ellis's Outlines of Social Economy in 1867 is regarded as Japan's earliest study of western economics.

He served in the Genroin, and was afterwards appointed to the House of Peers. He was ennobled with the title of danshaku (baron) in the kazoku peerage system.

External links
 

1830 births
1898 deaths
Meiji Restoration
People from Gifu Prefecture
Members of the House of Peers (Japan)
Kazoku